Ziyad al-Nakhalah (April 6, 1953) is a Palestinian Islamic militant, leader of the Palestinian Islamic Jihad (PIJ) since 28 September 2018, which has been designated a terrorist organisation by the United States, the European Union, the United Kingdom, Japan, Canada, Australia, New Zealand and Israel. Al-Nakhalah was designated a Specially Designated Terrorist by the United States in 2014.

Al-Nakhalah is said to currently live in either Lebanon or Syria, and he remains the leader of the Gaza-based Islamist group Palestinian Islamic Jihad (PIJ).

Biography
Ziyad al-Nakhalah was born on 6 April 1953 in Khan Yunis, Gaza, then under Egyptian occupation. 

In 1971, al-Nakhalah was sentenced to life imprisonment in Israel because of his militant activities with the Arab Liberation Front. He was one of the 1,150 security prisoners released by Israel on 21 May 1985 in a prisoner swap under the Jibril Agreement. 

After his release from Israeli prison, then-PIJ secretary-general Fathi Shikaki tasked al-Nakhalah with establishing in the Gaza Strip the group’s military wing, the Al-Quds Brigades. Al-Nakhalah was detained again by Israel in April 1988 for his role in the first Intifada, and was exiled to Lebanon in August 1988 with other PIJ leaders.

Al-Nakhalah became deputy secretary general of PIJ in 1995. 

On 23 January 2014, al-Nakhalah was designated a Specially Designated Terrorist by the United States, resulting in his property and interests in the United States being frozen. The US also offered a $5-million reward for information leading to his capture.

Al-Nakhalah was elected secretary general of PIJ on 28 September 2018, succeeding Ramadan Shalah, who suffered a series of strokes in April 2018.

References

1953 births
Living people
People from Khan Yunis Governorate
Islamic Jihad Movement in Palestine members
Palestinian prisoners sentenced to life imprisonment
Palestinian Sunni Muslims
Individuals related to Iran Sanctions
Fugitives wanted by the United States
Specially Designated Nationals and Blocked Persons List
Individuals designated as terrorists by the United States government